The Foreign Minister of Senegal is a cabinet-level position in the government of the Republic of Senegal. The position was founded upon independence of Senegal from France in 1960.

List of Foreign Ministers of Senegal

References

Government of Senegal
Lists of government ministers of Senegal